The Dresden Coinage Convention of 1838 was a multilateral treaty that attempted to bring some degree of standardisation to the currencies used in the Zollverein.

The convention was agreed to at the General Mint Convention of the States of the German Customs Union or Zollverein, held at Dresden. The conference had been prompted in part by the Munich Coin Treaty of 1837, by which the south German states adopted a unified currency. The Dresden Treaty was concluded on 30 July 1838 and was ratified by the States of the Zollverein at a follow-up meeting on 7 January 1839. The contracting parties to the convention agreed to use either the Prussian thaler or the gulden; the treaty established permanently fixed exchange rates between the two currencies. The thaler was agreed to be equal to 1.75 gulden and thus the gulden was agreed to be equal to 4/7 thaler.

The parties to the treaty were the states that at the time were members of the Zollverein: Baden, Bavaria, Frankfurt, Hesse-Darmstadt, Hesse-Homburg, Hesse-Kassel, Nassau, Prussia, Reuss-Gera, Reuss-Greiz, Saxe-Altenburg, Saxe-Coburg and Gotha, Saxe-Meiningen, Saxe-Weimar-Eisenach, Saxony, Schwarzburg-Rudolstadt, Schwarzburg-Sondershausen, and Württemberg.

Further standardisation came in 1857, when the Zollverein states and Austria agreed to the Vienna Monetary Treaty. By 1857, the Dresden Convention had also been accepted by Brunswick, Hanover, and Oldenburg. Luxembourg did not accept the Dresden Convention, even though it joined the Zollverein in 1842.

References
Forrest Capie, "Monetary Unions in Historical Perspective: What Future for the Euro in the International Monetary System", Open Economies Review 9:447-466 (1998).
William Arthur Shaw, A History of Currency, 1252 to 1896 (New York : Augustus M. Kelley, 1967)

1838 treaties
Currency treaties
Treaties of the Grand Duchy of Baden
Treaties of the Kingdom of Bavaria
Treaties of the Free City of Frankfurt
Treaties of the Grand Duchy of Hesse
Treaties of the Electorate of Hesse
Treaties of the Duchy of Nassau
Treaties of the Kingdom of Prussia
Treaties of the Principality of Reuss-Gera
Treaties of the Principality of Reuss-Greiz
Treaties of the Duchy of Saxe-Altenburg
Treaties of Saxe-Coburg and Gotha
Treaties of the Duchy of Saxe-Meiningen
Treaties of the Grand Duchy of Saxe-Weimar-Eisenach
Treaties of the Kingdom of Saxony
Treaties of Schwarzburg-Rudolstadt
Treaties of Schwarzburg-Sondershausen
Treaties of the Kingdom of Württemberg
Treaties of the Duchy of Brunswick
Treaties of the Kingdom of Hanover
Treaties of the Duchy of Oldenburg
1838 in Europe
Treaties of Hesse-Homburg
German Confederation